Captain Richard Watson Howard (9 October 1896 – 22 March 1918) was a World War I flying ace credited with eight aerial victories.

References

1896 births
1918 deaths
Australian World War I flying aces
Australian Flying Corps officers
Australian military personnel killed in World War I